Vance Astrovik, also known as Justice and formerly known as Marvel Boy, is a superhero appearing in American comic books published by Marvel Comics. The character possesses the superhuman power of telekinesis and has often been affiliated with the New Warriors and The Avengers. He appeared in Giant-Size Defenders #5 (July 1975) for the first time, which was created by Don Heck and Gerry Conway.

Publication history
More than a decade after his creation, Vance appeared first as a mainstay in the New Warriors and later in the third volume of the Avengers titles. He usually appeared with Firestar, who was his girlfriend and then later fiancee.

In 1994, he had his own four-issue limited series, Justice: Four Balance and appeared in the I (heart) Marvel: Masked Intentions one-shot in 2006.

He was a major character in Avengers: The Initiative early in the series.

Justice appeared as a supporting character in Avengers Academy from issue #1 (Aug. 2010) through issue #20 (Dec. 2011).

Fictional character biography
Vance Astrovik was born in Saugerties, New York. He was visited as a teenager by an alternate, time-travelling version of his future self, Major Vance Astro of the Guardians of the Galaxy, an astronaut who had volunteered for an experimental space flight and consequently been lost in space in cryogenic suspension for a thousand years. The elder Vance Astro convinced his younger self not to become an astronaut and, in the process, sparked the premature emergence of the younger Vance's telekinetic powers. Due to the vagaries of time travel in the Marvel Universe, this did not create a paradox but instead made the Guardians' future world into a parallel timeline, to which they later returned. Although Major Vance Astro had not had a chance to fully develop his psionic power in his time in NASA, the younger Astrovik now had the opportunity to hone his power. Astrovik soon became the costumed crime-fighter Marvel Boy.

Early adventures
After his powers developed, Vance's father, Arnold, began to physically abuse him for being "different". Running away from home, Vance wound up supporting himself as a professional wrestler in the Unlimited Class Wrestling Federation, a circuit for superhuman competitors. While wrestling as "Manglin' John Mahoney", he befriended Ben Grimm, a.k.a. the Thing, who at the time was himself estranged from his "family", the Fantastic Four. Eventually, Vance was convinced to return home, with assurances from his parents that the abuse would stop.

New Warriors
When Marvel Boy was rejected for membership in the Avengers by Captain America, he helped found a team of teenage superheroes, the New Warriors, led by the new hero Night Thrasher. He had many intense times during this early period, such as a fight against the White Queen, her Hellions, and the immortal villain Gideon. At the same time, Vance developed friendships with the other Warriors and a romantic relationship with teammate Firestar, and his powers increased both in strength and skill. However, his costumed activities renewed Arnold Astrovik's prejudice towards Vance's powers; both Vance and his mother suffered from Arnold's abusive behavior, and Vance's instinctively protecting himself with his powers only made things worse, with tragic consequences.

Murder trial
One night, Arnold Astrovik not only attacked a disadvantaged Vance (injured in a fight with Terrax and further injured by Gideon) but struck his wife when she tried to intervene. In one burst of his ever-growing superpowers and pent-up emotion, Vance lashed out at his abusive father and unintentionally killed him. Vance turned himself in and went to trial, charged with first-degree murder and negligent homicide. He was defended by attorney Foggy Nelson. The Thing was a character witness for Vance and helped establish the history of abuse that he suffered, as did Vance's mother, Norma; other testimony established the good he had done as a costumed hero and his increasing competence with his powers. However, the prosecuting attorney pursued the latter angle, using testimony from Firestar and cross-examination of Norma Astrovik to establish that Vance could have used his powers to stop his father without lethal force. Finally, in her closing argument, the prosecutor drew a gun on Vance and fired a (unknown to Vance) blank round. Instinctively, Vance not only disarmed her but reacted so precisely that he contained the actual smoke from the gun, driving home the prosecution's case. Vance was acquitted of murder, but he was convicted of negligent homicide. As a result of the trial, Vance's secret identity became public knowledge.

Vance was sentenced to serve his time at the superhuman restraint facility known as the Vault. He was shown enjoying the occasional free walkabout on the long road trip to the Vault, joking and playing around with the officers. When his friends Firestar, Namorita, and Nova arrived to free him, Vance protested, declaring he would serve his time. He also said he was going to be paroled in fourteen months, so they would see him again then. Firestar, even though trying to remain restrained, was very upset, but she recognized what Vance wanted to do and came to terms with it. 

During his stay in the Vault, he was granted "training periods" with the Guardsmen on duty, determined to hone his abilities to prevent another incident like his father's death. When a riot broke out over the perception of poor living conditions, Vance helped calm the riot by convincing the warden to allow the plant-based villain Terraformer (once part of the Force of Nature) access to a plant. Despite the warden's fears that Terraformer would use it in an escape attempt, the villain simply enjoyed it being with him. This calmed the other prisoners, and it was agreed that, on a case-by-case basis, their living conditions would be examined to accommodate superhuman prisoners' unique needs.

Justice
After his time in the Vault, he adopted the codename Justice. He briefly went undercover working with Shinobi Shaw to spy on the activities in the so-called "Younghunt."

When the Sphinx, a previous Warriors foe, dispersed members of the team throughout history, Vance encountered his father as an adolescent. He discovered that Arnold, his father, was a homosexual who was bullied into accepting a heterosexual lifestyle by his own abusive father. Understanding that his father was as much a victim as he was, Vance attempted to change history by threatening his grandfather but stopped when he realized that he was, in his own way, perpetuating the cycle of violence handed down from father to son. Though history remained unchanged, this new knowledge allowed Vance to make a measure of peace with the memory of his father.

Justice spent some time in a leadership role with the New Warriors and talked about marriage with Firestar. However, when she learned her microwave powers might render her infertile, such plans were endangered.

The Avengers
A mystical incident had caused all those who were once Avengers to be targeted by creatures and monsters. Vance and Angelica accompanied their friend Rage, who had been an Avenger, to a meeting at Avengers Mansion. They willingly helped out in various ways before Morgan le Fay attacked, altering reality. Vance and Angelica were caught up in the literal mystical maelstrom and were turned into super-powered enforcers under the command of le Fay. However, several Avengers managed to break free of the control based on their deep belief in the team itself. Vance found himself coming to his senses despite never being an Avenger, a fact that surprised the remaining heroes; thus, he joined the resistance.

After the threat of le Fay was ended and the two proved themselves by defeating Whirlwind on their own, they managed to become Avengers. Although he was thrilled to be living his lifelong dream of being an Avenger, Vance made some small rookie mistakes at first, stemming from a case of hero-worship. However, he proved himself when he came up with a way to defeat the current plans of the current form (or forms) of the villain Ultron, despite a broken leg. Vance and Angelica then spent some time undercover investigating the Triune Understanding, a cult-like movement with seemingly good intentions but villainous leadership.

After the House of M ended, Justice and Firestar were unaffected by the global depowerment of mutants and thus retained their powers. Vance's wish for more in their relationship, as opposed to Firestar's wish for less (being ages 22 and 19, respectively), ended their engagement and their relationship.

Civil War
Justice and former teammate Rage learned that people were hunting down former New Warriors members because of perceived blame for the deaths caused by Nitro in Stamford, Connecticut, while fighting an incarnation of the team. They both sought out the legal services of Jennifer Walters (She-Hulk) in protecting the allies of the New Warriors, as their identities were already publicly exposed. They eventually discovered that former New Warriors member Carlton LaFroyge (Hindsight) was responsible for the persecution and exposure of their teammates, operating a website that was slowly outing the identities of the twenty or so remaining Warriors.

Both Rage and Justice refused to go along with the proposed super-human registration act. This is further evidenced when they join Captain America's Secret Avengers during the Civil War as a result of the death of Bill Foster.

The Initiative
After the Civil War, Justice was recruited by Iron Man to head the youth outreach arm of The Initiative superhero training program based at Camp Hammond. He is clearly unaware of some of the shadier aspects of the program, and is growing increasingly irritated by the Initiative "Drill Sergeant" Gauntlet's constant demeaning and disparaging remarks about the deceased New Warriors. During the investigation of former New Warriors members due to an attack upon Gauntlet, it was revealed to readers that Justice is currently secretly seeing Ultra Girl, a trainee with the Initiative and former New Warriors associate.

Justice's personal investigation into the fate of Initiative recruit MVP opened his eyes to the morally ambiguous activities of the Initiative, instituted by Camp Hammond director Henry Peter Gyrich. As a result, Justice apparently deserted from the Initiative to continue his investigation and recruited Ultra Girl, Rage, and other former New Warriors Debrii and Slapstick to his cause. After a clone of MVP goes rogue and leaves the Initiative with major casualties, Justice and these former New Warriors, along with the two surviving Scarlet Spiders, officially inform Iron Man of their intention to quit the Initiative and act as Counter Force, a form of independent oversight for the program; as the group is all registered superhumans, Iron Man is unable to act against Justice's team unless they commit an illegal act. However, Ultra Girl decides to return to the Initiative, apparently ending her relationship with Justice.

Secret Invasion
During the Skrull invasion, Justice and Counter Force encounter Night Thrasher (Donyell Taylor) at the old New Warriors, looking for a DNA sample to prove whether or not the Night Thrasher that died at Stamford was a Skrull imposter. Counter Force initially believes that Donyell is a Skrull due to his reluctance to reveal his identity, and comes into conflict with Donyell's New Warriors. When Donyell finally reveals his identity the two teams join together to storm the S.H.I.E.L.D. helicarrier where the deceased New Warriors bodies were being held and recover them. The corpse of Night Thrasher is proven to be of human composition, and the two teams bury the bodies outside the old base.

Dark Reign
When Ragnarok, a deranged clone of Thor, attacks Camp Hammond, Counter Force (Now calling themselves "The New Warriors" and boasting Night Thrasher as a member) arrives to help. During the fight, Ragnarok kills one of the Scarlet Spiders and nearly kills Vance, who is saved by Ultra Girl. After the battle, Vance retrieves the corpse of the original MVP, seeking to give him a proper burial. However, their actions in exposing the duplicity to the public allowed H.A.M.M.E.R. director Norman Osborn to shut down Camp Hammond and reorganize the Initiative, placing villains on Initiative teams. The New Warriors rescued Gauntlet and Tigra from the Hood's gang and formed the Avengers Resistance.

Siege
Things hit the tipping point for the Resistance when Osborn orchestrates a siege on Asgard by creating an incident similar to Stamford. Justice declares that while most of the Initiative is busy with the Siege, the Resistance will take down Camp H.A.M.M.E.R. in order to expose Osborn once and for all.

Heroic Age
Vance becomes one of the teaching staff of "Avengers Academy", alongside former Avengers teammates Hank Pym, Tigra, Quicksilver, and former New Warriors teammate Speedball. One of his students, Veil, has a secret crush on him until she finds out that he has renewed his relationship with Ultra Girl. His relationship with Ultra Girl is further complicated during the Avengers Academy Prom Night when Firestar appears.

During the "Outlawed" storyline, Vance appears as a member of C.R.A.D.L.E. when a law is passed that forbids superheroes who are below the age of 21.

Powers and abilities
Justice is a mutant who possesses telekinesis. By using his powers to lift himself, he can levitate and fly at high speed. He has shown the ability to hold a large number of people. Initially, Justice's telekinesis was limited in its scope, and using them at the peak level of his power would cause him headaches and nosebleeds. However, his powers later increased dramatically, and he was no longer hindered by the physical symptoms he had once suffered from.

Other versions
The Vance Astrovik character in an alternate timeline became a founding member of the Guardians of the Galaxy, calling himself Vance Astro. Marvel has treated this as a separate character from the alternate Earth-691, and the two have even met on occasion.

In other media
In the Fantastic Four animated series, Justice makes a brief cameo at the beginning of the episodes "To Battle the Living Planet" and "Doomsday" alongside Darkhawk.

Justice appears as a non-playable character in Marvel: Ultimate Alliance 2, voiced by Sean Donnellan. He ends up under the control of the nanites and assists A-Bomb in fighting the heroes in Wakanda on the path to the Black Panther's palace. He mentions his past and his relationship with Firestar.

References

Avengers (comics) characters
Characters created by Don Heck
Characters created by Gerry Conway
Comics characters introduced in 1975
Fictional professional wrestlers
Jewish superheroes
Marvel Comics characters who can move at superhuman speeds
Marvel Comics characters who have mental powers
Marvel Comics martial artists
Marvel Comics mutants
Marvel Comics superheroes
Marvel Comics telekinetics
Marvel Comics telepaths